Below Par Records is an Australian independent record label established in 2000 by three sixteen-year-old Sydney high-school students, Jai Al-Attas, Mark Catanzariti and Steven Chalker.

In 2001, Matt Hawkes replaced Steven Chalker as the third partner. Below Par Records won the Nescafe Big Break competition in 2002 and, in 2003, Below Par Records went into a label development deal with Eleven owned by John Watson and Melissa Chenery. In 2005 Below Par Records started an imprint called OK!Relax in which they released records by The Scare and Die!Die!Die!. Today, Below Par Records is home to gold-selling artist Kisschasy as well as Something With Numbers, The Scare and Teenage Fairytale Dropouts. Below Par Records is distributed by Virgin/EMI in Australia and New Zealand.

Current and former signings 
The Colour
Die!Die!Die!
For Amusement Only
In the Grey
Jim Ward
Kisschasy
Last Years Hero
The Living End
MC Lars
The Scare
Something With Numbers
Vaux

See also 
 Below Par Records discography
 List of record labels

References

External links
 

Australian independent record labels
Indie rock record labels
Alternative rock record labels
Record labels based in Sydney